This is a list of compositions by Nikos Skalkottas.

The list

Orchestral works 
 Symphonic Suite No. 1 (1929)
 36 Greek Dances (1931–36; new orchestrations of many dances made 1949, and individual numbers arranged for other ensembles – see e.g. String Orchestra)
 Overture (often called Symphony) The Return of Ulysses (c. 1942)
 Symphonic Suite No. 2 (1944–46; 1949; orchestration unfinished; the movements listed have been performed as separate works)
 1. Overtüre Concertante
 4. Largo Sinfonico
 5. Tema con variazioni (orchestration unfinished)
 Classical Symphony for wind orchestra, two harps and double basses (1947)
 Ancient Greek March (1947; in two versions by the composer: small symphony orchestra and wind orchestra)
 Four Images (1948; orchestrated from movements of ballet The Land and sea of Greece)
 Sinfonietta in B-flat minor (1948–9)
 Greek Dance in C minor (1949? – unrelated to the 36 Greek Dances)

Concertos 
 Concerto Grosso for wind orchestra (1928–31; lost)
 Concerto for violin, piano and chamber orchestra (1930)
 Piano Concerto No. 1 (1931)
 Concertino for 2 pianos and orchestra (1935)
 Piano Concerto No. 2 (1937)
 Violin Concerto (1938)
 Cello Concerto (1938; lost)
 Concertino for Oboe and Piano (1939; later adapted for solo oboe and chamber orchestra by Gunther Schuller)
 Piano Concerto No. 3 (1939; for piano and 10 wind instruments)
 Concerto for violin, viola and large wind orchestra (1940–42)
 Double Bass Concerto (1942)
 Concerto for 2 violins (1944–45; not orchestrated)
 Piano Concertino (1948–49)
 Nocturne-Divertimento for xylophone and orchestra (1949)

Ballets 
 The Maiden and Death (1938, revised 1946)
 The Gnomes (1939; partly based on piano pieces by Bartók and Stravinsky)
 Island Images, ballet suite (1943; not orchestrated)
 The Beauty with the Rose (1946)
 The Land and the Sea of Greece (1947–48; not orchestrated except first four movements as Four Images)
 The Sea (1948–49)

Works for string orchestra
 3 Greek Dances (1936)
 7 Greek Dances (1936)
 10 Sketches (c. 1940)
 Little Suite for strings (1942)

Incidental music 
 Mayday Spell, a Fairy Drama for soprano, speakers and orchestra (1944; 1949)
 Henry V, incidental music for Athens Radio (1947–48)

Chamber music 
 Sonata for solo violin (1925)
 String Quartet (1926; lost)
 String Trio (1926; lost)
 String Quartet No. 1 (1928)
 Sonatina No. 1 for violin and piano (1929; partly lost)
 Sonatina No. 2 for violin and piano (1929)
 String Quartet No. 2 (1929–30; lost)
 Easy Music for string quartet (c. 1930; lost)
 Octet (1931)
 String Trio No. 2 (1935)
 Sonatina No. 3 for violin and piano (1935)
 Sonatina No. 4 for violin and piano (1935)
 String Quartet No. 3 (1935)
 Piano Trio (1936)
 Little Chorale and Fugue for violin and piano (c. 1936)
 March of the Little Soldiers for violin and piano (c. 1936)
 Nocturne for violin and piano (c. 1937)
 Rondo for violin and piano (c. 1937)
 8 Variations on a Greek Folk Tune for piano trio (1938)
 Gavotte for violin and piano (1939)
 Concertino for Oboe and Piano (1939)
 Scherzo for violin, viola, cello and piano (1936–40)
 Scherzo for violin and piano (c. 1940)
 Largo for cello and piano (c. 1940)
 Menuetto Cantato for violin and piano (c. 1940)
 10 Sketches for string quartet (or string orchestra) (c. 1940)
 String Quartet No. 4 (1940)
 Duo for violin and viola (1939–42)
 Quartet for oboe, trumpet, bassoon and piano (1940–43)
 Concertino for trumpet and piano (1940–43)
 Tango and Foxtrot, for oboe, trumpet, bassoon and piano (1940–43)
 Sonata for violin and piano (1940–43)
 Sonata Concertante for bassoon and piano (1943)
 Petite Suite No. 1 for violin and piano (1946)
 Petite Suite No. 2 for violin and piano (1946)
 Duo for violin and cello (1947)
 3 Greek Folksong arrangements for cello and piano (c. 1942–48)
 Bolero for cello and piano (1948–9)
 Tender Melody for cello and piano (1948–9)
 Serenata for cello and piano (1948–9)
 Sonatina for cello and piano (1949)
 Gero Dimos for string quartet (1949)

Vocal music 
 Choral work (R. Stein) on the Unknown Soldier (1930; lost)
 Doe for voice and piano (1931)
 16 Melodies for mezzo-soprano and piano (1941; texts by Hrissos Esperas)

Piano music 
 Greek Suite (1924–25)
 15 Little Variations (1927)
 Sonatina (1927)
 Suite No. 1 (1936)
 32 Piano Pieces (1940)
 4 Etudes (1941)
 Suite No. 2 (1941)
 Suite No. 3 (1941)
 Suite No. 4 (1941)
 Berceuse (1941)
 Echo (1946)
 Procession to Acheron (c. 1948)

References

Skalkottas, Nikos
Greek National School